The Night Café is a British indie pop band from Liverpool. The band consists of Sean Martin (vocals/guitar), Josh Higgins (guitar), Arran O'Connell Whittle (bass) and Carl Dillon (drums). The band formed in 2013, released two EPs: Get Away from the Feeling and Bunkbed in 2017 and 2018, respectively, before releasing their debut studio album 0151 in 2019.

History 
The band's name comes from the Vincent van Gogh painting of the same name (originally known as Le Café de nuit). The band formed in 2014 while the members were still in secondary school, and bonded over mutual musician interests such as Title Fight and Kings Of Leon.

The quartet recorded their first singles, "Growing Up" and "Addicted" at the Whitewood Recording Studio in Liverpool, which were both produced by Robert Whiteley. The band released their debut EP, Get Away From The Feeling in 2017, which was followed by opening for the band Sundara Karma during the summer 2017. The following year, the band released Bunkbed, their second EP.

On 8 May 2019, the band announced their debut studio album, 0151, which was released on 23 August 2019.

Discography

Studio album 
 0151 (2019) – No. 84 UK

Extended plays 
 Get Away from the Feeling (2017)
 Bunkbed (2018)
 For Better Days (2021)

References

External links 

English rock music groups
English indie rock groups
Musical groups established in 2014
Musical quartets
2014 establishments in England